The Eswatini Ambassador in Taipei is the official representative of the Government in Mbabane to the Government of Taiwan.

History 
In 6 September 1968 diplomatic relations between the governments of Eswatini and the Republic of China were established, when the Embassy of the Republic of China was installed in Mbabane.

List of representatives

References 

 
Taiwan
Eswatini